RR Lyrae is a variable star in the Lyra constellation, figuring in its west near to Cygnus. As the brightest star in its class, it became the eponym for the RR Lyrae variable class of stars and it has been extensively studied by astronomers. RR Lyrae variables serve as important standard candles that are used to measure astronomical distances. The period of pulsation of an RR Lyrae variable depends on its mass, luminosity and temperature, while the difference between the measured luminosity and the actual luminosity allows its distance to be determined via the inverse-square law. Hence, understanding the period-luminosity relation for a local set of such stars allows the distance of more distant stars of this type to be determined.

History
The variable nature of RR Lyrae was discovered by the Scottish astronomer Williamina Fleming at Harvard Observatory in 1901.

Variable star class

This type of low-mass star has consumed the hydrogen at its core, evolved away from the main sequence, and passed through the red giant stage. Energy is now being produced by the thermonuclear fusion of helium at its core, and the star has entered an evolutionary stage called the horizontal branch (HB). The effective temperature of an HB star's outer envelope will gradually increase over time. When its resulting stellar classification enters a range known as the instability strip—typically at stellar class A—the outer envelope can begin to pulsate. RR Lyrae shows just such a regular pattern of pulsation, which is causing its apparent magnitude to vary between 7.06 and 8.12 over a short cycle lasting 0.56686776 days (13 hours, 36 minutes). Each radial pulsation causes the radius of the star to vary between 5.1 and 5.6 times the Sun's radius.

This star belongs to a subset of RR Lyrae-type variables that show a characteristic behavior called the Blazhko effect, named after Russian astronomer Sergey Blazhko. This effect is observed as a periodic modulation of a variable star's pulsation strength or phase; sometimes both. It causes the light curve of RR Lyrae to change from cycle to cycle. In 2014, Time-series photometric observations demonstrated the physical origin of this effect.

Other stellar classifications
As with other RR Lyrae-type variables, RR Lyrae itself has a low abundance of elements other than hydrogen and helium – what astronomers term its metallicity: It belongs to the Population II category of stars that formed during the early period of the Universe when there was a lower abundance of metals in star-forming regions.

References

External links

 image RR Lyrae

182989
Lyra (constellation)
RR Lyrae variables
F-type giants
Lyrae, RR
A-type giants
095497
J19252793+4247040
BD+42 3338
TIC objects